Disarray may refer to:

 Disarray, an EP by Pound
 "Disarray", a song by Red Flag from The Eagle and Child, 2000
 "Disarray", a song by Lifehouse from Who We Are, 2007
 "Disarray", a song by Erra from Neon, 2018
 "Disarray", a song by Tommy Keene
 "Miss Disarray", a single by Gin Blossoms from No Chocolate Cake, 2010